Georgi Georgiev may refer to:

Arts
Georgi Georgiev-Getz (1926–1996), actor
Georgi Georgiev-Gogo (born 1971), Bulgarian voice actor

Summer sports
Georgi Georgiev (footballer born 1963), Bulgarian footballer who played in the 1994 FIFA World Cup
Georgi Georgiev (judoka) (born 1976), Bulgarian judoka who won a bronze medal in the 2004 Summer Olympics
Georgi Georgiev (judoka, born 1947), Bulgarian judoka
Georgi Georgiev (footballer born 1988), Bulgarian goalkeeper playing for PFC Levski Sofia
Georgi Georgiev (footballer born 1970), Bulgarian footballer
Georgi Krasimirov Georgiev (born 1981), Bulgarian footballer
Georgi Petrov Georgiev (born 1985), Bulgarian cyclist
Georgi Georgiev (discus thrower) (born 1961), Bulgarian discus thrower
Georgi Georgiev (hurdler) (born 1968), Bulgarian hurdler
Georgi Georgiev (rower) (born 1951), Bulgarian rower

Winter sports
Georgi Georgiev (alpine skier) (born 1987), Bulgarian alpine skier